La Pesquera is a municipality located in the province of Cuenca, Castile-La Mancha, Spain. According to the 2009 census (INE), the municipality has a population of 252 inhabitants.

See also
Manchuela

Municipalities in the Province of Cuenca